is a railway station in Motegi, Tochigi Prefecture, Japan, operated by the Mooka Railway.

Lines
Motegi Station is a terminal station for the Mooka Line, and is located 41.9 rail kilometers from the opposite terminus of the line at Shimodate Station.

Station layout
Motegi Station has one side platform. The station also has a steam-powered railway turntable for use by steam locomotives

History
Motegi Station opened on 15 December 1920 as a station on the Japanese Government Railway, which subsequently became the Japanese National Railways (JNR).  The station was absorbed into the JR East network upon the privatization of the JNR on 1 April 1987, and the Mooka Railway from 11 April 1988.

Surrounding area
 Motegi Town Hall
 Motegi Post Office

Bus routes
JR Bus Kanto
For Utsunomiya Station and Twin Ring Motegi
NasuKarasuyama Municipal Bus
For Karasuyama Station and Ichihana Station

References

External links

  Mooka Railway Station information 

Railway stations in Tochigi Prefecture
Railway stations in Japan opened in 1920
Motegi, Tochigi